Cotys may refer to:

People
 Cotys I (disambiguation), multiple people
 Cotys II (disambiguation), multiple people
 Cotys III (disambiguation), multiple people
 Cotys IV, Odrysian king of Thrace
 Cotys V, Odrysian king of Thrace
 Cotys VI, King of Thrace
 Cotys VII, King of Thrace
 Cotys VIII, King of Thrace
 Cotys IX, son to Cotys VIII and Roman Client King of Lesser Armenia
 Tiberius Julius Cotys I (fl. 1st century), second grandson to Cotys VIII and King of the Bosporan Kingdom
 Tiberius Julius Cotys II (fl. 2nd century), King of the Bosporan Kingdom
 Tiberius Julius Cotys III (died 235), King of the Bosporan Kingdom

Mythology 

 Cotys, mythical king of Lydia in Greek mythology.

Other uses
 Cotys (insect), a genus of insect in the family Tetrigidae

See also
 
 
 Kotys
 Kotys (surname)
 Coty (disambiguation)